CF Markville, also known as Markville Shopping Centre in the Cadillac Fairview chain of malls, is a shopping mall of over 140 stores in Markham, Ontario, Canada. It is located at the intersection of Highway 7 East and McCowan Road, and runs along Bullock Drive, located slightly west of McCowan Road. Its anchors are Hudson's Bay, Winners, Walmart Supercentre, Decathlon, Sporting Life, Marshalls, Uniqlo, Best Buy, and a Toys "R" Us/Babies "R" Us combo store. It was the largest shopping mall in York Region until 2004 when Vaughan Mills opened.

History
The shopping centre was developed by JDS Development and opened in 1982. The mall was named for its proximity to the historical villages of Markham and Unionville (now both incorporated in the city of Markham). The name was originally planned to be called Markville Town Centre. The site of the mall was originally a nursery garden. It was once part of the 100 acres Lot 11 for George Eckhart up to 1862 and Eckhart estate thereafter. Once the land was acquired, it was two decades before construction started. High-rises and government buildings were planned to be built around the shopping centre, but the plan was not passed. 

The original ground floor featured an artificial waterway and a central reflecting pool with a water fountain that spouted a two storey column. The Pool could be drained for special occasions and in the holiday season would become Santa's Workshop. Among its initial tenants were the Eaton's department store, and a Famous Players 4-screen cinema. The mall was renovated in 1991 as part of an expansion because more American retailers were entering Canada. Sears and Hudsons Bay were included in this expansion project. The mall is now owned by Cadillac Fairview since 1997.

Best Buy, which opened in 2003, was originally a Miracle Food Mart supermarket. Walmart entered the mall in 1994 with two levels. They expanded their lower level in 2004. The upper level became Winners.

Markville was renovated by EllisDon for  million from 2011-2013. The renovation coincided with an initiative to add new brands to Canada or the Greater Toronto Area.  of the common area was renovated, including new glass railings, flooring, washrooms, and removing the lower level rivers.  of existing tenant space was renovated with high-end tenants.

A new  food court known as the "Express Eatery" opened on August 23, 2012, next to the former Sears store on the lower level. The upper-level food court next to Best Buy has been remodelled into shop space. According to EllisDon, this was the most challenging aspect of the renovation.

Sears closed on February 28, 2015. The upper level of the former Sears space opened as Saks Off 5th on March 8, 2018, while the lower level opened as Marshalls on September 24, 2019. Saks Off 5th closed on April 16, 2022, and it was replaced by Decathlon on November 24, 2022.

Sport Chek closed in 2012 and was replaced by Forever 21. Forever 21 closed in Spring 2018 to make way for Japanese retailer Uniqlo to open in its Canadian expansion, one of the four new locations in Canada. Uniqlo opened on October 12, 2018.

A few Chinese retailers have opened in the mall, including Hong Kong-based Lukfook Jewellery, Osim, and Chinese-based Miniso. 

On April 5, 2021, Porsche Centre Markham, located at the intersection of McCowan Road & Bullock Drive, which is located just outside the mall near Saks Off 5th, officially commenced operations.

Transportation access
The mall is accessible by York Region Transit (YRT)/Viva, Toronto Transit Commission and GO Transit.

Most YRT routes stop close to the mall on the southside with only VIVA buses stopping along Highway 7. TTC route also stops on McCowan Road. GO Transit buses stop along Bullock Drive and GO Centennial riders on Stouffville rail line need to walk across Bullock to access the mall.

Gallery

Anchors

See also
List of largest shopping centres in Canada
List of shopping malls in Canada

References

External links

 Markville Shopping Centre website
 Centre Directory

Shopping malls in the Regional Municipality of York
Shopping malls established in 1982
Buildings and structures in Markham, Ontario
Tourist attractions in Markham, Ontario
1982 establishments in Ontario
Cadillac Fairview